Michael Poole may refer to:
Michael Poole (activist), Canadian intentional community founder
Michael Poole (producer), Canadian film maker and author
Michael Poole (politician) (born 1984), Falkland Islands politician
Mike Poole (born 1986), Welsh rugby union player